Jumping for Joy is a 1956 British comedy film directed by John Paddy Carstairs and starring Frankie Howerd, Stanley Holloway, Joan Hickson and Lionel Jeffries.

Plot 
Willie Joy (Frankie Howerd) works at a greyhound track as a cleaner, which involves his picking up droppings from the dog track between races. He is tricked into standing in the line of the lure and falls on it as it speeds passed with the dogs chasing it. He gets fired. This times itself with a useless dog also being let go by an owner (Bert Benton) and Joy plays a small sum and takes it home. His landlady is less than pleased at a dog in his room and evicts him.

He meets Captain Montague (Stanley Holloway) and together they hatch a plan to make money from the dog. They give it the name of "Lindy Lou".

To play the part Joy steals a top hat and tails to wear to the races at White City Stadium (London). When Lindy starts to prove herself at the trials Benton wants to buy her back.

Wandering around the East End he foolishly enters a snooker hall and flashes £20 around. A pretty girl tries to hustle him out of the money by playing a snooker set. Various crooks use Joy as an unwitting collaborator in fixing races and placing large bets.

The crooks pass doped meat to be given to the dog but Joy and Montague eat it themselves. The crooks find them asleep but cannot find the dog. They detach the Captain's railway carriage home and move it onto an active railway line. When they awake they are told by a local that they are near Doncaster. The dog is rescued just before the carriage is hit by a train. They re-encounter Lord and Lady Cranfield (from whom he earlier stole the suit) and they give him a lift to the White City.

Lindy Lou wins the Gold Cup but only due to a distraction in crowd as Joy hits a policeman to ensue a whistle is blown. He is arrested and recognises the distinctive shoes of Haines of Scotland Yard as the ringleader of the crooks.

He also gets mixed up with criminals who want to fix the race by doping dogs. The greyhound in the film called Lindy Lou was actually a racing greyhound called Moyshna Queen from Wandsworth Stadium.

Cast
 Frankie Howerd as Willie Joy
 Stanley Holloway as Captain Jack Montague
 A. E. Matthews as Lord Reginald Cranfield
 Tony Wright as Vincent
 Alfie Bass as Mr Blagg
 Joan Hickson as Lady Emily Cranfield
 Lionel Jeffries as Bert Benton
 Susan Beaumont as Susan Storer
 Terence Longdon as John Wyndham
 Colin Gordon as Max, the commentator
 Richard Wattis as Carruthers
 Danny Green as Plug Ugly
 Barbara Archer as Marlene
 William Kendall as Blenkinsop
 Ewen Solon as Haines
 Reginald Beckwith as Smithers
 Charles Hawtrey as Man at Bar (uncredited)
 Bill Fraser as drunk in snooker hall (uncredited)
 George A. Cooper as farmer who tells them they are near Doncaster (uncredited)
 Andrew Faulds as friend of drunk man (uncredited)
 Richard Dunn as policeman (uncredited)
 Joyce Gardner as the pool room hustler (uncredited) - Joyce was a well known professional pool player at the time, not an actress
 Beatrice Varley as Joy's landlady (uncredited)
 John Warren as main commentator (uncredited)
 Tom Gill as second commentator (uncredited)

Critical reception
Halliwell's Film and Video Guide 2000 describes the film as a "totally predictable star comedy which needs livening up" and the Time Out Film Guide 2009 describes the film as "lame". While TV Guide called the film a "Sporadically funny comedy".

Musical score
The New York Times noted, "the delightful harmonica score in Jumping for Joy is provided by American expatriate Larry Adler".

References

External links
 

1956 films
1956 comedy films
British comedy films
Films shot at Pinewood Studios
Films and television featuring Greyhound racing
Films set in London
Greyhound racing films
1950s English-language films
1950s British films
British black-and-white films